In molecular biology, the ter site, also known as DNA replication terminus binding-site, refers to a protein domain which binds to the DNA replication terminus site. Ter-binding proteins are found in some bacterial species, and include the tus protein which is part of the common ter-tus binding domain. They are required for the termination of DNA replication and function by binding to DNA replication terminator sequences, thus preventing the passage of replication forks. The termination efficiency is affected by the affinity of a particular protein for the terminator sequence.

In E. coli, there are 10 closely ter related sites encoded in the chromosome. The sites are designated TerA, TerB, ..., TerJ. Each site is 23 base pairs.

Function
A DNA replication terminus (ter) has a role in preventing  progress of the DNA replication fork. Therefore, a DNA replication terminus site-binding protein binds to this site helping to block the DNA replication fork. There are two genes controlling ter-binding activity, named tau and tus.

References

Protein families